Precious Little is an album by British blues musician Jeremy Spencer, who was a member of Fleetwood Mac from 1967–71. Released on 18 July 2006, this is his fourth official solo album (his first since 1979) and was released on the Bluestown Records label in Norway, though Bluestown Records later licensed it to Blind Pig Records. The album was recorded over five days in 2005 in a Norwegian studio during the Notodden Blues Festival.

Local musicians were used to back Spencer on all tracks, because he believed that "they have retained the 'purity' of the old blues in their playing". Most of the tracks were self-penned, with the addition of covers of songs by Elmore James and Slim Rhodes.

The album was produced by Kjetil Draugedalen and Gaute Fredriksen, and the executive producer was Jostein Forsberg. It was mixed at the Supermono Studio, Oslo, and was mastered by Audun Strype at Strype Audio, Oslo.

Track listing
 "Bitter Lemon" (Jeremy Spencer) – 4:03
 "Psychic Waste" (Spencer, J. Phoenix) – 4:19
 "It Hurts Me Too" (Elmore James) – 4:49
 "Please Don't Stop" (Gordon Galbraith) – 2:47
 "Serene Serena" (Trad. arr. Spencer) – 4:43
 "Dr. J" (Spencer) – 3:55
 "Bleeding Heart" (James) – 4:47
 "Many Sparrows" (Spencer) – 2:21
 "Trouble and Woe" (Spencer) – 4:18
 "Maria de Santiago" (Spencer) – 3:55
 "Take and Give" (Ronnie Hesselbein, Slim Rhodes) – 2:21
 "Precious Little" (Spencer) – 4:29

Personnel
 Jeremy Spencer – vocals, harmony vocals, slide guitar, resonator
 Trond Ytterbø – harmonica, mandolin, harmony vocals
 Rune Endal – bass guitar, double bass
 Runar Boyesen – keyboards
 Anders Viken – drums, percussion
 Espen Liland – guitar, graphic design
 Svenn Åge Frydenberg – trumpet
 Leif Winther – saxophone
 Marianne Tovsrud Knutsen – harmony vocals
 Margit Bakken – harmony vocals
 Roger Arntzen – additional bass guitar on "Many Sparrows"
 Kjetil Draugedalen – producer, engineer, mixing
 Jostein Forsberg – executive producer
 Gaute Fredriksen – producer, engineer, mixing
 Morten Gjerde – photography
 Audun Strype – mastering
Recorded at Juke Joint Studio, Notodden, Norway

Release information
Bluestown Records (Norway) – BTR 1017 (CD)

References

 Sleeve notes for "Precious Little" by Jeremy Spencer and Jostein Forsberg

External links
 Bluestown Records
 Blues Matters! catalogue review

Jeremy Spencer albums
2006 albums